Imre Madách de Sztregova et Kelecsény (20 January 1823 – 5 October 1864) was a Hungarian aristocrat, writer, poet, lawyer and politician. His major work is The Tragedy of Man (Az ember tragédiája, 1861). It is a dramatic poem approximately 4000 lines long, which elaborates on ideas comparable to Goethe's Faust and Milton's Paradise Lost. The author was encouraged and advised by János Arany, one of the most famous of the 19th-century Hungarian poets.

Life
He was born in his family castle in Alsósztregova, the Kingdom of Hungary (today Dolná Strehová, Slovakia) in 1823 at the heart of a wealthy noble family. From 1829 Madách studied at the Piarist  school of Vác. During a cholera epidemic he stayed in Buda in 1831. In 1837 he began his studies at the university of Pest. In 1842 he officially became a lawyer. In 1860 he finished working on The Tragedy of Man. He died in Alsósztregova in the Kingdom of Hungary.

Works
A civilizátor (The Civiliser) – 1859
Mózes (Moses) – 1861
Az ember tragédiája (The Tragedy of Man) – 1861

The Tragedy of Man

The dramatic poem The Tragedy of Man is Madách's major and most enduring piece of writing. The tragic events of the failed Hungarian Revolution of 1848/49 in addition to the deaths of close family members such as his sister and her husband, captain Karl Balog de Mánko-Bük, and his temporary stay in prison fueled the emotional status in which he completed his work. Today it is the central piece of Hungarian theaters' repertoire and is mandatory reading for students in secondary school. Many lines have become common quotes in Hungary. Madách, then a country nobleman with virtually no literary experience, sent the work to the poet Arany who enthusiastically encouraged him and suggested some emendations to the text. The piece was at first only published in printed form, not staged, because the many changes of scene (15 scenes) were hard to come by through the technical standards of the day.

The main characters are Adam, Eve and Lucifer. The three travel through time to visit different turning-points in human history and Lucifer tries to convince Adam that life is (will be) meaningless and mankind is doomed. Adam and Lucifer are introduced at the beginning of each scene, with Adam assuming various important historical roles and Lucifer usually acting as a servant or confidant. Eve enters only later in each scene. The Tragedy of Man contains fifteen scenes, with ten historical periods represented.

Honors
A postage stamp was issued in his honor by Hungary on 1 July 1932.
On 23 June 2010, The Tragedy of Man is 150 years old - Miniature Sheet issued by Hungary.

References

External links
 The Tragedy of Man (translation by George Szirtes)
 The Tragedy of Man (translation by J. C. W. Horne)
 The Tragedy of Man (translation by Iain Macleod)
 Tragedy of the Man (translation by  Ottó Tomschey)
 Mihály Zichy's Illustrations of The Tragedy of Man
 Works by Madách Imre: text, concordances and frequency lists

1823 births
1864 deaths
People from Veľký Krtíš District
Hungarian male dramatists and playwrights
19th-century Hungarian dramatists and playwrights
19th-century Hungarian male writers